Constantine I (died 1412) was King of Georgia from 1405 or 1407 until his death in 1412. He is the common ancestor of all surviving branches of the Bagrationi dynasty.

Biography
Constantine was the elder son of King Bagrat V of Georgia by his second wife, Anna of Trebizond. His maternal grandparents were Alexios III of Trebizond and Theodora Kantakouzene.

In 1400, Constantine was sent as an ambassador to the Turco-Mongol warlord Timur (Tamerlane) who continued a relentless and devastating war against the Georgians. Afterwards, he vainly demanded from his reigning half-brother George VII to make peace with Timur. In 1402, Constantine together with the prince Ioane Jakeli of Samtskhe submitted to Timur but never took part in the war against Georgia. He succeeded on the death of George VII as king in 1407 and launched a program of restoration of what had been ruined and destroyed during Timur’s campaigns. Towards 1411, he allied with the Shirvanshah Ibrahim I and the ruler of Shaki Sidi Ahmed to counter the Kara Koyunlu Turkmen advance into the Caucasus. In the decisive Battle of Chalagan, the allies were routed and Constantine, his half-brother David and the Shervanshah Ibrahim were taken prisoner. In the captivity, he behaved arrogantly and the infuriated Turkoman prince Kara Yusuf ordered him, David, and 300 Georgian nobles to be executed. Kara Yusuf put Constantine to death by his own hand.

Family
Constantine was married to Natia, daughter of Kutsna, Prince-Chamberlain (amirejibi) of Georgia. There is little information available regarding Natia's family: it may have been the house of Khurtsidze from Samtskhe or the Gabelisdze, purported ancestors of the Amirejibi family, from Shida Kartli. Kutsna himself was ambassador at Constantinople around 1386.

Constantine had three sons, Alexander, Bagrat and George, all of whom were co-opted by their father as co-kings between 1405 and 1408.

 Alexander (1390–1446), succeeded his father as the king of Georgia and reigned until his abdication from the throne in 1442
 George, prince
 Bagrat, prince

Ancestry

References

1369 births
1410s deaths
Kings of Georgia
Bagrationi dynasty of the Kingdom of Georgia
Executed monarchs
Executed people from Georgia (country)
People executed by the Kara Koyunlu
15th-century executions
Eastern Orthodox monarchs
14th-century people from Georgia (country)
Monarchs taken prisoner in wartime